Iraneuton Sousa Morais Júnior (born 22 July 1986), known as Júnior Morais or Júnior Maranhão, is a Brazilian professional footballer who plays as a left-back for Liga I club Rapid București.

Career
Morais spent the first years of his senior career in Brazil and Portugal, with São Cristóvão and Freamunde, respectively. In 2011, he joined Astra Ploiești in Romania, which was later relocated and renamed Astra Giurgiu. Over the course of six and a half seasons, Morais totalled 256 matches and eight goals in all competitions for Astra; he also aided to four domestic trophies, including the 2015–16 Liga I title.

He continued in the country and its Liga I for the 2017–18 and 2018–19 campaigns, signing for FCSB. Morais transferred to Turkish club Gaziantep in the summer of 2019, where he rejoined former Astra manager Marius Șumudică. He spent two additional years in the Süper Lig before returning to Romania with Rapid București, aged nearly 35.

Personal life
In 2015, Morais married Romanian handballer Andreea Dospin. They have two children together, a girl and a boy, with his former Astra teammate Constantin Budescu baptizing them. Despite earlier reports, Morais stated in October 2020 that he does not hold Romanian citizenship.

Career statistics

Club

Honours
Astra Giurgiu
Liga I: 2015–16
Cupa României: 2013–14
Supercupa României: 2014, 2016

References

External links

Astra Giurgiu official profile 

People from São Luís, Maranhão
Sportspeople from Maranhão
1986 births
Living people
Association football defenders
Brazilian footballers
Association football midfielders
São Cristóvão de Futebol e Regatas players
S.C. Freamunde players
FC Astra Giurgiu players
FC Steaua București players
Gaziantep F.K. footballers
FC Rapid București players
Liga Portugal 2 players
Liga I players
Süper Lig players
Brazilian expatriate footballers
Expatriate footballers in Portugal
Expatriate footballers in Romania
Brazilian expatriate sportspeople in Portugal
Brazilian expatriate sportspeople in Romania
Brazilian expatriate sportspeople in Turkey